Heinrich Brody (German), Bródy Henrik (Hungarian) or Haim Brody (21 May 1868 – 1942) was a Hungarian (after 1918 Czechoslovakian) rabbi. He was born in Ungvár, in the Ung County of the Kingdom of Hungary (present-day Ukraine).

He was a descendant of Abraham Broda. Educated in the public schools of his native town and at the rabbinical colleges of Tolcsva and Pressburg, Hungary, Brody also studied at the Hildesheimer Theological Seminary and at the University of Berlin, being an enthusiastic scholar of the Hebrew language and literature.

He was for some time secretary of the literary society Mekiẓe Nirdamim, and in 1896 founded the "Zeitschrift für Hebräische Bibliographie", of which he was coeditor with A. Freiman.

Brody was the rabbi of the congregation of Náchod, Bohemia and chief rabbi of Prague (both cities then part of Austria-Hungary), before moving to Palestine. In Czechoslovakia, he was the leader of the Mizrachi movement.

Literary works 
Brody is author or editor of the following works:

 "Hebräische Prosodie von Imm. Frances, mit Einleitung und Anmerkungen", Cracow, 1892;
 "Haschlamah zum Talm. Tractat Berachot, von R. Meschullam b. Mose", Berlin, 1893;
 "Beiträge zu Salomo da-Piera's Leben und Wirken", Berlin, 1893;
 "David Cassel's Biographie", Cracow, 1893;
 "Ein Dialog von Imm. Frances", Cracow, 1893;
 "Offener Brief an Herrn Prof. M. Hartmann", Berlin, 1894;
 "Literarhistor. Mitteilungen", No. 1, Cracow, 1894;
 "Studien zu den Dichtungen Yehuda ha-Levi's", i.: "Ueber die Metra der Versgedichte", Berlin, 1895;
 "Zehn Gedichte aus dem Dîwân Moses ibn Esra", Leipzig, 1896;
 "Der Dîwân des Yehuda ha-Levi", vols. i. and ii.1, 1894–1901;
 "Weltliche Gedichte des Abu' Ajjub Soleiman b. Yahja (Solomon) ibn Gabirol", No. 1-2, Berlin, 1897–1898;
 "Arnold B. Ehrlichs, Mikra ki-Peschuto Kritisch Beleuchtet", Cracow, 1902;
 "Mikra Kodesch", 1902.

He has also published, under the assumed name of Dr. H. Salomonsohn, "Widerspricht der Zionismus Unserer Religion?" 1898, and is a contributor to "Ha-Maggid," "Israelitische Monatsschrift," "Magazin für die Wissenschaft des Judenthums," "Monatsschrift für Geschichte und Literatur des Judenthums," "Allgemeine Zeitung des Judenthums," "Évkönyv," "Ha-Eshkol," "Ha-Shiloaḥ," etc.

References 

By Isidore Singer & Frederick T. Haneman

External links 
 
 Zeitschrift für hebraeische Bibliographie, a digitized periodical edited by Bródy, at the Leo Baeck Institute, New York

1868 births
1942 deaths
Clergy from Uzhhorod
Ukrainian Jews
Religious Zionist Orthodox rabbis
Hungarian rabbis
Czech Orthodox rabbis
Czechoslovak emigrants to Mandatory Palestine
Burials at the Jewish cemetery on the Mount of Olives